Sakura-Con is an annual three-day anime convention held during March or April at the Washington State Convention Center in Seattle, Washington. The convention, which is traditionally held over Easter weekend, is the largest anime convention in the Northwest. It is organized by the volunteer Asia-Northwest Cultural Education Association (ANCEA).

Programming 
The convention typically offers anime game shows, anime music video contest, art show, artist alley, dances/raves, collectible card gaming, cosplay chess, cosplay contest, exhibitors hall, fashion show, Japanese cultural arts and presentations (aikido demonstrations, kabuki performances, kendama play, kendo swordsmanship, taiko drumming, tea ceremonies), Japanese pop and rock concerts, karaoke, masquerade ball, panels, table top RPG gaming, video gaming (arcade, console, PC), 24-hour video theaters. The convention runs programming for 24 hours a day.

In 2002 the charity auction benefited the Make-A-Wish Foundation and raised $4,560. The 2010 charity auction also benefiting the Make-A-Wish Foundation raised $27,000. The convention before holding fundraisers at the 2012 event raised $90,000 for tsunami relief. The 2015 charity auction benefited the Make-A-Wish Foundation and raised over $40,000. In 2016, a blood drive was held for Bloodworks Northwest.

History 

Sakura-Con's roots are from within the local science fiction convention community. A number of anime fans, including Daniel Harrison, decided that there was not enough anime content represented at conventions such as Norwescon, hatched the plan for an anime convention in a Tacoma, Washington comic book shop. Originally named Baka!-Con, (baka or ばか is Japanese for idiot,) the first convention was held at the Double Tree Inn in Tukwila, Washington in 1998. In 2000, Baka!-Con changed its name to Sakura-Con, (sakura or 桜 (alternately: さくら) is Japanese for cherry blossom).

In 2002 the convention utilized 70 percent of the convention space at the Seattle Airport Hilton & Conference Center along with having county representatives and the local Japanese Consulate General speak at opening ceremonies. Several guests canceled appearances in 2003, Yoko Ishida and Maria Yamamoto due to Pioneer company policy on traveling during international strife, and Akitaro Daichi and Atsushi Okuda. The 2004 convention had a warm body attendance cap of 4,500 people. In 2005 Sakura-Con had to limit its attendance to 5,100 and turned people away, resulting in the convention's move to the Washington State Convention & Trade Center.

The event ran for over 55 hours in 2007 and had 1,200 hours of programming, with only about half the attendees being from the Seattle area. Tatsunori Konno, the CEO of Bandai Visual USA, was heavily questioned about the company's pricing policies during their 2007 panel. In 2009 the event included five concerts, three dances, a large gaming area, seven theaters, and over 1,000 hours of programming. Registration line waits of three hours or more occurred due to the convention's growth. Sakura-Con in 2009 brought an estimated $13 million to the Seattle economy.

The convention covered six floors in 2010 and included six gaming rooms, seven panel rooms, and five video rooms. At the opening ceremonies a wedding proposal occurred between two staff members. The Dazzle Vision and High and Mighty Color concert had over 4,000 attendees. Exist Trace's concert in 2011 drew over 3,000 attendees. Before the 2012 convention around 12,000 attendees pre-registered. Sakura-Con 2013 had the second largest impact of area conventions, adding $19 million to the local economy. During the 2014 convention a cosplayer was held up at the nearby Freeway Park. Sakura-Con was cancelled in 2020 and 2021 due to the COVID-19 pandemic.

Event history

ANCEA
The Asia-Northwest Cultural Education Association (Sakura-Con organizers) were given the Foreign Minister's Award from Japan on May 30, 2012. The award was given at the residence of the Japanese Consul General Kiyokazu Ota.

Collaborations
Sakura-Con in 2013 returned to host the Anime Costume Contest at Dragon Fest 2013 in Seattle, Washington's Chinatown for the fourth time.

References

External links 

 
 

1998 establishments in Washington (state)
Anime conventions in the United States
Annual events in Washington (state)
Culture of Seattle
Festivals in Seattle
Recurring events established in 1998
Seattle Area conventions
Conventions in Washington (state)